The 2007 Chinese Professional Baseball League (CPBL) season began on March 17 in Kaohsiung County when the defending champion La New Bears played host to the Uni-President Lions.  The season concluded in late October with the Uni-President Lions defeating the La New Bears in Game 7 of the Taiwan Series.

Competition

Six teams, the La New Bears, Uni-President Lions, Sinon Bulls, Chinatrust Whales, Brother Elephants and Macoto Cobras will contest the CPBL, the highest level of professional baseball played in Taiwan.  The season is divided into two halves, with each team playing fifty games in each half.  The winners for each half-season plus the non-winner with the best overall record will qualify for the playoffs.  In the event that the same team wins both halves, the next two teams with the best overall records will advance.

Game results

Standings

First half standings

Macoto Cobras win the first half and advance to the 2007 Chinese Professional Baseball League playoffs.

Second half standings

 La New Bears win the second half and advance to the 2007 Chinese Professional Baseball League playoffs.

Overall standings
The team among the non-half-season-winners with the best overall record will gain the wild card spot and the third seed in the playoffs.  

Green denotes first half or second half champion.
Yellow denotes wild card position.

Statistical leaders

Hitting

Pitching

Month MVP

Milestones

March 22 - Huang Chung-Yi of the Sinon Bulls records his 1500th career base hit against the Macoto Cobras.
March 24 - Chang Tai-Shan plays in his 1000th career game against the Brother Elephants
October 3 - Kao Kuo-ching hits the 144th hit against the Brother Elephants right-hander Yeh Yong-chieh and records the most hits in a single season currently.

Postseason

Uni-President Lions wins the 2007 Taiwan Series.
Taiwan Series Most Valuable Player: (Uni-President)
Taiwan Series Outstanding Player:(La New), (Uni-President)

See also
 2007 Chinese Professional Baseball League playoffs

External links

Chinese Professional Baseball League season
CPBL season
Chinese Professional Baseball League seasons